Nothing Barred is a 1961 British black and white comedy film directed by Darcy Conyers and starring Brian Rix, Leo Franklyn and Naunton Wayne.

Plot
Penniless Lord Whitebait (Naunton Wayne) plans to save his dwindling fortunes by opening his stately home, Whitebait Manor near Egham, to the public. But public interest proves minimal, and with rapidly mounting debts and the spiralling costs of his daughter's upcoming wedding threatening to ruin him, Whitebait is forced to take desperate measures. He and his servant Spankforth (Charles Heslop) plot to stage the theft of a valuable painting from Whitebait Manor.

They go to Wormwood Scrubs prison to collect a suitable prisoner being released, but in error collect Wilfred Sapling (Brian Rix), a plumber who has been doing repairs in the prison. Their conversation to get the man to steal a painting is at cross purposes and he thinks they are discussing plumbing.

Meanwhile, elsewhere, a burglar Barger chooses his next target and throws a dart at a map, hitting the town of Egham.

Barger attempts to rob Whitebait Manor but is caught and sent to prison

Sapling goes to the prison to repair the plumbing and helps Barger and other convicts escape

The group of convicts led by Barger escape through the sewers dressed as a church choir. Sapling follows them  and he in turn is pursued by PC Budgie.

Sapling and Barger steal a police car to escape but are caught by the police

Cast

 Brian Rix - Wilfred Sapling
 Leo Franklyn - Barger
 Naunton Wayne - Lord Whitebait
 Charles Heslop - Spankforth
 Ann Firbank - Lady Katherine
 John Slater - Warder Lockitt
 Vera Pearce - Lady Millicent
 Arnold Bell - Governor
 Alexander Gauge - Traffic Policeman
 Jack Watling - Peter Brewster
 Irene Handl - Elsie
 Bernard Cribbins - the lodger
 Wally Patch - Magazine Stall Proprietor (billed as Walter Patch)
 Wilfrid Lawson - Albert
 Terry Scott - PC Budgie
 Henry Kendall - Parson
 Lionel Ngakane - Convict	
  Raymond Ray - Convict	
 Andrew Sachs - Convict
 Denis Shaw - Convict

Critical reception
TV Guide gave the film two out of four stars, and noted, "Another amusing farce by the Rix-Conyers team."

References

External links

1961 films
1961 comedy films
British comedy films
1960s English-language films
1960s British films